"She Says" is the third single from singer/songwriter Howie Day's second full-length album, Stop All the World Now on July 26, 2005. This single is a revamped version from his debut album, Australia which released on November 1, 2000.

Charts

Weekly charts

Year-end charts

References

2005 singles
Howie Day songs
Music videos directed by Darren Grant
Song recordings produced by Warren Huart
2005 songs
Epic Records singles